Fengming Island is a major island located in the Bohai Sea, in the province of Liaoning, Northeast China.

Fengming Island is one of a group of islands located at the tip of the Liaodong Peninsula: Changxing Island and Xizhong Island lie to the north. The island is part of the Wafangdian district in the city of Dalian.

References

Islands of Liaoning
Bohai Sea
Dalian